Amanita flavipes is a species of Amanita found in oak and conifer forest of China, India, Japan, Pakistan, and South Korea.

References

External links

flavipes
Fungi of Asia
Fungi described in 1933